Gerald J. Rip is a former judge and Chief Justice of the Tax Court of Canada.

Life
Born to Harry and Pauline Rip in 1940, Rip was a 1958 graduate of Outremont High School. His son is an Ontario lawyer.

In May 2007, he spoke at the Canadian Petroleum Tax Society's conference, and in June 2009, he was the opening speaker at the Canadian Tax Foundation's Toronto conference.

Term as a lawyer
Rip was called to the Bar of Quebec in 1966, and was named Special Assistant to the Minister of Justice the following year. He joined the Department of Justice and focused on tax litigation until 1972.

In 1973, Rip was admitted to the Law Society of Upper Canada, and joined Soloway, Wright, Houston & Associates in Ottawa, where he remained until his July 1983 appointment to the Tax Court.

Term as a judge
Rip was appointed Associate Chief Justice of the Tax Court in September 2006, and was named Chief Justice on July 15, 2008. The appointment, by Stephen Harper, saw Rip replace Donald G.H. Bowman, and Rip's own role was filled by Eugene Rossiter. When his official portrait, painted by Cyril Leeper, was unveiled in the Supreme Court of Canada's Great Hall, Chief Justice Beverley McLachlin commissioned the same artist to paint her own portrait.

In his 2009 judgment in the suit Leola Purdy, Sons Ltd. v The Queen, he quoted Ralph Waldo Emerson in suggesting that "A foolish consistency is the hobgoblin of little minds".

References

Living people
Judges of the Tax Court of Canada
Canadian Orthodox Jews
1940 births
Université de Montréal alumni